Robert M. Witajewski (born November 17, 1946) is an American former diplomat who was a Senior Member of the American Foreign Service.

Life and career
Witajewski was born in Saginaw, Michigan on November 17, 1946. Under President George W. Bush, Witajewski served as Bureau of International Narcotics and Law Enforcement Country Director in Iraq.  Between 2002 and 2005, he served in Nassau, The Bahamas, much of the time he served as Chargé d'affaires or Chief of Mission.  While there, he was responsible for evacuating the embassy three times due to oncoming Category Four and Five hurricanes.

Witajewski was one of two State Department staffers to work with Princeton University’s Woodrow Wilson School of Public and International Affairs Masters in Public Policy program.

References

1946 births
Living people
Ambassadors of the United States to the Bahamas
United States Foreign Service personnel
George W. Bush administration personnel